In human genetics, Haplogroup J-M172 or J2 is a Y-chromosome haplogroup which is a subclade (branch) of haplogroup J-M304. Haplogroup J-M172 is common in modern populations in Western Asia, Central Asia, South Asia, Southern Europe, Northwestern Iran and North Africa. It is thought that J-M172 may have originated between the Caucasus, Anatolia and/or Western Iran.

It is further divided into two complementary clades, J-M410 and J-M12 (M12, M102, M221, M314).

Origins

The date of origin for haplogroup J-M172 was estimated by Batini et al in 2015 as between 19,000 and 24,000 years before present (BP). Samino et al in 2004 dated the origin of the parent haplogroup, J-P209, to between 18,900 and 44,500 YBP. Ancient J-M410, specifically subclade J-Y12379*, has been found, in a mesolithic context, in a tooth from the Kotias Klde Cave in western Georgia dating 9.529-9.895 cal. BP. This sample has been assigned to the Caucasus hunter-gatherers (CHG) autosomal component. J-M410, more specifically its subclade J-PF5008, has also been found in a mesolithic sample from the Hotu and Kamarband Caves located in Mazandaran Province of Iran, dating back to 9,100-8,600 B.C.E (approximately 11,000 ybp). Both samples belong to the Trialetian Culture.
It is likely that J2 men had settled over most of Anatolia, the South Caucasus and the Zagros mountains by the end of the Last Glaciation 12,000 years ago.

Zalloua and Wells 2004 and al-Zaheri 2003 claimed to have uncovered the earliest known migration of J2, expanded possibly from Anatolia and the Caucasus. In 2001, Nebel et al. found that, "According to Underhill et al. (2000), Eu 9 (H58) evolved from Eu 10 (H71) through a T→G transversion at M172 (emphasis added)," and that in today's populations, Eu 9 (the post-mutation form of M172) is strongest in the Caucasus, Asia Minor and the Levant, whilst Eu 10 becomes stronger and replaces the frequency of Eu 9 as one moves south into the Arabian Peninsula, so that people from the Caucasus met with Arabs near and between Mesopotamia (formerly Sumeria) and the Negev Desert, as "Arabisation" spread from Arabia to the Levant and Turkey, as well as many peoples (e.g. Jews, Armenians, Lebanese) having returned from diasporas.

Per research by Di Giacomo 2004, J-M172 haplogroup spread into Southern Europe from either the Levant or Anatolia, likely parallel to the development of agriculture. As to the timing of its spread into Europe, Di Giacomo points to events which post-date the Neolithic, in particular the demographic floruit associated with the rise of the Ancient Greek world. Semino et al. derived older age estimates for overall J2 (having used the Zhivotovsky method c.f. Di Giacomo), postulating its initial spread with Neolithic farmers from the Near East. However, its subclade distribution, showing localized peaks in the Southern Balkans, southern Italy, north/central Italy and the Caucasus, does not conform to a single 'wave-of-advance' scenario, betraying a number of still poorly understood post-Neolithic processes which created its current pattern. Like Di Giacomo, the Bronze Age southern Balkans was suggested by Semino 2004 to have been an important vector of spread.

Distribution
Haplogroup J-M172 is found mainly in the Fertile Crescent, the Caucasus , Anatolia, Italy, the Mediterranean littoral, and the Iranian plateau . Y-DNA: J2 (J-M172): Syrid/Nahrainid Arabid(s).

The highest reported frequency of J-M172 ever was 87.4%, among Ingush in Malgobek .

North Africa
Haplogroup J2 is found with low frequencies in North Africa.

Central Asia

J-M172 is found at moderate frequencies among Central Asian people such as Uyghurs, Uzbeks, Turkmens, Tajiks, Kazakhs, and Yaghnobis. According to the genetic study in Northwest China by Shou et al. (2010), a notable high frequency of J-M172 is observed particularly in Uyghurs 34% and Uzbeks 30.4% in Xinjiang, China. Liu Shuhu et al. (2018) found J2a1 (L26/Page55/PF5110/S57, L27/PF5111/S396) in 43.75% (28/64) and J2a2 (L581/S398) in 14.06% (9/64) of a sample of Lop Uyghurs from Qarchugha Village of Yuli (Lopnur) County, Xinjiang, J2a1b1 (M92, M260/Page14) in 25.64% (10/39) of a sample of Keriyan Uyghurs from Darya Boyi Village of Yutian (Keriya) County, Xinjiang, and J2a1 (L26/Page55/PF5110/S57, L27/PF5111/S396) in 3.95% (3/76) and J2a2 (L581/S398) in 3.95% (3/76) of a sample of Dolan Uyghurs from Horiqol Township of Awat County, Xinjiang. Only far northwestern ethnic minorities had haplogroup J in Xinjiang, China. Uzbeks in the sample had 30.4%  J2-M172 and Tajiks of Xinjiang and Uyghurs also had it.

The haplogroup has an ancient presence in Central Asia and seems to have preceded the spread of Islam . In addition, the immediate ancestor of J-M172, namely J* (J-M304*, a.k.a. J-P209*, J-12f2.1*) is also found among Xibo, Kazakh, Dongxiang and Uzbek people in Northwest China.

In 2015, two ancient samples belonging to J-M172 or J-M410 (J2a) were found at two different archaeological sites in Altai, eastern Russia: Kytmanovo and Sary-bel kurgan. Both of the ancient samples are related to Iron Age cultures in Altai. Sary-bel J2/J2a is dated to 50 BC whereas Kytmanovo sample is dated to 721-889 AD. Genetic admixture analysis of these samples also suggests that the individuals were more closely related to West Eurasians than other Altaians from the same period, although they also seem to be related to present-day Turkic peoples of the region.

Europe

In Europe, the frequency of Haplogroup J-M172 drops as one moves northward away from the Mediterranean. In Italy, J-M172 is found with regional frequencies ranging between 9% and 36% . In Greece, it is found with regional frequencies ranging between 10% and 48%. Approximately 24% of Turkish men are J-M172 according to a recent study,  with regional frequencies ranging between 13% and 40% . Combined with J-M267, up to half of the Turkish population belongs to Haplogroup J-P209.

It has been proposed that haplogroup subclade J-M410 was linked to populations on ancient Crete by examining the relationship between Anatolian, Cretan, and Greek populations from around early Neolithic sites in Crete. Haplogroup J-M12 was associated with Neolithic Greece (ca. 8500 - 4300 BCE) and was reported to be found in modern Crete (3.1%) and mainland Greece (Macedonia 7.0%, Thessaly 8.8%, Argolis 1.8%) .

North Caucasus

J-M172 is found at very high frequencies in certain peoples of the Caucasus: among the Ingush 87.4% , Chechens 55.2% , Georgians 21%-72%, Azeris 24% -48%,  Abkhaz 25%,  Balkars 24% , Ossetians 24% , Armenians 21% -24% , Adyghe 21.8% , and other groups (  and ).

West Asia

Sephardi Jews have about 15% -29% , of haplogroup J-M172, and Ashkenazi Jews have 15% -23% . It was reported in an early study which tested only four STR markers  that a small sample of Italian Cohens belonged to Network 1.2, an early designation for the overall clade now known as J-L26, defined by the deletion at DYS413. However, a large number of all Jewish Cohens in the world belong to haplogroup J-M267 (see Cohen modal haplotype).

Haplogroup J-M172 has been shown to have a more northern distribution in the Middle East, although it exists in significant amounts in the southern middle-east regions, a lesser amount of it was found when compared to its brother haplogroup, J-M267, which has a high frequency southerly distribution. It was believed that the source population of J-M172 originated from the Levant/Syria (Syrid-J-M172), and that its occurrence among modern populations of Europe, Central Asia, and South Asia was a sign of the neolithic agriculturalists. However, as stated it is now believed more likely to have been spread in waves, as a result of post-Neolithic processes .

South Asia
Haplogroup J2 has been present in South Asia mostly as J2a-M410 and J2b-M102, since neolithic times (9500 YBP).
J2-M172 was found to be significantly higher among Dravidian castes at 19% than among Indo-European castes at 11%. J2-M172 and J-M410 is found 21% among Dravidian middle castes, followed by upper castes, 18.6%, and lower castes 14%. Among caste groups, the highest frequency of J2-M172 was observed among Tamil Vellalars of South India, at 38.7%. J2 is present in Indian tribals too and has a frequency of 11% in Austro-Asiatic tribals. Among the Austro-Asiatic tribals, the predominant J2 occurs in the Asur tribe (77.5%) albeit with a sample size of 40 and in the Lodha (35%) of West Bengal. J2 is also present in the South Indian hill tribe Toda at 38.46% albeit with a sample size of only 26, in the Andh tribe of Telangana at 35.19%, in the Narikuravar tribe at 57.9% and in the Kol tribe of Uttar Pradesh at a frequency of 33.34%. Haplogroup J-P209 was found to be more common in India's Shia Muslims, of which 28.7% belong to haplogroup J, with 13.7% in J-M410, 10.6% in J-M267 and 4.4% in J2b .

In Pakistan, the highest frequencies of J2-M172 were observed among the Parsis at 38.89%, the Dravidian speaking Brahui's at 28.18% and the Makrani Balochs at 24%. It also occurs at 18.18% in Makrani Siddis and at 3% in Karnataka Siddis.

J2-M172 is found at an overall frequency of 16.1% in the people of Sri Lanka. In Maldives, 22% of Maldivian population were found to be haplogroup J2 positive. Subclades of M172 such as M67 and M92 were not found in either Indian or Pakistani samples which also might hint at a partial common origin.

J2-M172 has been observed in 15.9% (20/164 J2a-M410, 6/164 J2b2-M241) of Tharu from Uttar Pradesh, 13.4% (19/202 J2a-M410, 8/202 J2b2-M241) of Tharu from Nepal, and 8.9% (4/45 J2a-M410) of Tharu from Uttarakhand.

Subclade distribution
Haplogroup J-M172 is subdivided into two complementary sub-haplogroups: J-M410, defined by the M410 genetic marker, and J-M12, defined by the M12 genetic marker.

J-M172 
J-M172 is typical of populations of the Near East, Southern Europe, Southwest Asia and the Caucasus, with a moderate distribution through much of Central Asia, South Asia, and North Africa.

J-M410 
J-M410* is found in Georgia, North Ossetia.

J-M47 
J-M47 is found with low frequency in Georgia,  southern Iran , Qatar  Saudi Arabia , Syria , Tunisia , Turkey ( and ), the UAE, and Central Asia/Siberia .

J-M67 
J-M67 (called J2f in older papers) has its highest frequencies associated with Nakh peoples. Found at very high (majority) frequencies among Ingush in Malgobek (87.4%), Chechens in Dagestan (58%), Chechens in Chechnya (56.8%) and Chechens in Malgobek, Ingushetia (50.9%) . In the Caucasus, it is found at significant frequencies among Georgians (13.3%) , Iron Ossetes (11.3%), South Caucasian Balkars (6.3%) , Digor Ossetes (5.5%), Abkhaz (6.9%), and Cherkess (5.6%) . It is also found at notable frequencies in the Mediterranean and Middle East, including Cretans (10.2%), North-central Italians (9.6%), Southern Italians (4.2%; only 0.8% among N. Italians), Anatolian Turks (2.7-5.4%), Greeks (4-4.3%), Albanians (3.6%), Ashkenazi Jews (4.9%), Sephardis (2.4%), Catalans (3.9%), Andalusians (3.2%), Calabrians (3.3%), Albanian Calabrians (8.9%) (see  and ).

J-M92/M260, a subclade of J-M67, has been observed in 25.64% (10/39) of a sample of Keriyan Uyghurs from Darya Boyi Village of Yutian (Keriya) County, Xinjiang. This Uyghur village is located in a remote oasis in the Taklamakan Desert.

J-M319 
J-M319 is found with low to moderate frequency in Cretan Greeks ( and ), Iraqi Jews , and Moroccan Jews .

J-M158 
J-M158 (location under L24 uncertain) J-M158 is found with low frequency in Turkey , South Asia ( and ), Indochina , and Iberian Peninsula.

Phylogenetics
In Y-chromosome phylogenetics, subclades are the branches of haplogroups. These subclades are also defined by single nucleotide polymorphisms (SNPs) or unique event polymorphisms (UEPs).

Phylogenetic history

Prior to 2002, there were in academic literature at least seven naming systems for the Y-Chromosome Phylogenetic tree. This led to considerable confusion. In 2002, the major research groups came together and formed the Y-Chromosome Consortium (YCC). They published a joint paper that created a single new tree that all agreed to use. Later, a group of citizen scientists with an interest in population genetics and genetic genealogy formed a working group to create an amateur tree aiming at being above all timely. The table below brings together all of these works at the point of the landmark 2002 YCC Tree. This allows a researcher reviewing older published literature to quickly move between nomenclatures.

Research publications
The following research teams per their publications were represented in the creation of the YCC Tree.

Phylogenetic trees
There are several confirmed and proposed phylogenetic trees available for haplogroup J-M172. The scientifically accepted one is the Y-Chromosome Consortium (YCC) one published in Karafet 2008 and subsequently updated. A draft tree that shows emerging science is provided by Thomas Krahn at the Genomic Research Center in Houston, Texas. The International Society of Genetic Genealogy (ISOGG) also provides an amateur tree.

The Genomic Research Center draft tree 
This is Thomas Krahn at the Genomic Research Center's draft tree Proposed Tree for haplogroup J-M172 . For brevity, only the first three levels of subclades are shown.

M172, L228
M410, L152, L212, L505, L532, L559
PF5008
Y182822
L581
Z37823
PF4610
Z6046
L26
M12, M102, M221, M314, L282
M205
M241
M99
M280
M321
P84
L283

The Y-Chromosome Consortium tree
This is the official scientific tree produced by the Y-Chromosome Consortium (YCC). The last major update was in 2008 . Subsequent updates have been quarterly and biannual. The current version is a revision of the 2010 update.

The ISOGG tree
Below are the subclades of Haplogroup J-M172 with their defining mutation, according to the ISOGG tree (as of January 2020). Note that the descent-based identifiers may be subject to change, as new SNPs are discovered that augment and further refine the tree. For brevity, only the first three levels of subclades are shown.

J2 M172/Page28/PF4908, L228/PF4895/S321
J2a M410, L152, L212/PF4988, L559/PF4986
J2a1 DYS413≤18, L26/Page55/PF5110/S57, F4326/L27/PF5111/S396
J2a1a M47, M322
J2a1b M67/PF5137/S51
J2a1c M68
J2a1d M319
J2a1e M339
J2a1f M419
J2a1g P81/PF4275
J2a1h L24/S286, L207.1
J2a1i L88.2, L198
J2a2 L581/PF5026/S398
J2a2a P279/PF5065
J2b M12
J2b1 M205
J2b2 M241
J2b2a1 L283

See also

Genetics

Other Y-DNA J Subclades

Y-DNA Backbone Tree

References

Sources for conversion tables

Bibliography

Further reading 

 
 
 
 
 
 
 
 
 
 
 
 
  This paper reported results from several studies : Di Giacomo 2003, Al-Zahery 2003, Flores 2004, Cinnioglu 2004, Capelli 2005, Goncalves 2005, Zalloua 2008, Cadenas 2008

External links 
Migration of Indians Across Continents spanning generations: A Case History of the Saluja Family.
In Lebanon DNA may yet heal rifts

Phylogenetic notes

J2